Deje is a locality situated in Forshaga Municipality, Värmland County, Sweden with 2,742 inhabitants in 2010.

References 

Populated places in Värmland County
Populated places in Forshaga Municipality